The Cleveland Motorcycle Manufacturing Company, sometimes called Cleveland Motorcycle, was a motorcycle manufacturer in Cleveland, Ohio, from 1902 to 1905 and again from 1915 to 1929.

Two-stroke singles
The first Cleveland  of 1915 had a  displacement two-stroke single-cylinder engine with a longitudinal crankshaft orientation, necessitating a worm drive to turn the axis of rotation of the drive to the transmission by 90°. The transmission was a two speed with a sprocket turning a chain final drive. Besides driving the transmission, the engine's countershaft extended back to drive a magneto that hung in front of the rear wheel. In 1920, the motorcycle's weight increased from the addition of fenders, a larger fuel/oil tank, and in 1921 the seat was enlarged, along with a still larger fuel/oil tank, and a battery was added. During World War I, US forces used the Cleveland as a base courier.

Four-strokes, four cylinders, and failure

In 1924, two years after buying out Reading-Standard, Cleveland replaced their two-stroke engine with a  four-stroke single-cylinder engine. In 1925 they released a motorcycle with a  T-head four-cylinder engine designed by L. E. Fowler. With a smaller engine than rival four-cylinder motorcycles by Henderson and Ace, Cleveland's first four-cylinder motorcycle did not sell well. In 1926, Cleveland replaced the Fowler engine with a new design by E. H. DeLong. The new engine had an inlet-over-exhaust valve configuration and a displacement of forty-five cubic inches. The displacement was increased to sixty-one cubic inches the following year.

By 1928 Cleveland had financial problems.  That year, the company offered itself for sale to Harley-Davidson. Harley-Davidson considered the offer, as Cleveland's new four-cylinder motorcycles offered a ready-made competitor to Indian's Ace-based fours, but rejected it in favor of developing their own four.

In 1929 Cleveland announced their Tornado model, with a lowered frame and seat height, lightweight pistons, larger valves, and a higher compression ratio. A Century model, with a guaranteed top speed of one hundred miles per hour, was announced.

A few months after the Wall Street Crash of 1929, after building only a few prototypes of the Century, Cleveland went out of business.

References

External links

 The Cleveland Motorcycle (1919) - 17-page promotional brochure including photographs, pricing, specifications, and additional information on the motorcycle.

Motorcycle manufacturers of the United States
Manufacturing companies based in Cleveland